Ten Years is the first extended play (EP) by American pop music duo Aly & AJ. It was released on November 17, 2017. Ten Years serves as their first release in ten years, following the release of their third studio album Insomniatic (2007), which reached number 15 on the Billboard 200. It is additionally their first release since their departure from Hollywood Records in 2010; the record was released on their own label, Aly & AJ Music, LLC.

A departure from their previous commercial pop rock sound, Ten Years instead opted for a 1980s-inspired musical composition that consisted of echoed vocals, an 808-inspired drum machine, and synth pads. The EP was preceded by the release of two singles: "Take Me" and "I Know". Ten Years has received positive reviews from music critics, who praised the blend of 1980's-inspired music and modern contemporary production, as well as praising the duo's songwriting. The album has peaked at #25 on the US Independent Albums chart. The EP was additionally promoted by the Promises Tour, which the duo embarked on through July 2018.

A deluxe version of Ten Years was released on November 30, 2018, which included the release of the single "Good Love".

Background 
Aly & AJ released three studio albums under Hollywood Records: Into the Rush (2005), Acoustic Hearts of Winter (2006), and Insomniatic (2007), the latter of which peaked at number 15 on the Billboard 200, and contained the single "Potential Breakup Song", which reached number 17 on the Billboard Hot 100. The duo left the label in 2010, and began releasing music under 78violet. They released the single "Hothouse" in 2013, before returning to the name Aly & AJ. Despite this, the two were tired by the music business and subsequently stuck to acting. Aly currently plays Peyton Charles on iZombie, while AJ plays Lainey Lewis on The Goldbergs. In April 2016, the duo began recording music again, writing with Mike Elizondo and Ryan Spraker. In April 2017, the duo confirmed new music was on the way.

Composition
Ten Years is a synth-pop EP containing a nostalgic, synth-driven sound. The EP opens with lead single "Take Me", a "shimmery" synth-pop song, which contains a bombastic, flirtatious chorus. The single's instrumentation consists of synthesizers, vintage vocal processing and electronic drum kits, while it lyrically talks about the nerves of making a move on a crush. The second track, "I Know", is a dreamy dance-pop song inspired by the death of an acquaintance, who had died from cancer. It has a fluttering backbeat and distorted echoes, while containing simplistic verses. It was musically compared to the works of M83. 

"Promises" lyrically talks about the realization of a cheating partner in a confessional and nocturnal way. The duo called it the only song on the EP "more on the fictional side." "Promises" was originally not going to be included on the EP, but was added at the last minute. Musically, it incorporates a propulsive beat. The EP's closer, "The Distance", is a bittersweet reflection that looks back with wistful remembrance.

Promotion

Singles 
"Take Me" was announced as the lead single on June 2, 2017. The single was quietly released the same day, but was taken down quickly after. The single was noted for a change in the group's musical style, trading their commercial pop rock for 1980s-inspired synth-pop. The single received positive reviews from critics and had a vampire-themed music video released on September 14, 2017. "I Know" was released as the second single from the EP on November 3, 2017. The single was inspired by the death of an acquaintance, who had died from cancer.

"Good Love" was released as the third single from the EP on June 15, 2018. It was included on the deluxe version of the EP.

Tour 
The duo embarked on the Promises Tour to promote Ten Years. It ran from June 3 to July 6, 2018.

Critical reception 
Liz Cantrell of Spin called the album a "sinuous, slinky comeback, weaving an 80s synth sensibility with contemporary beats," as well as "a promising turn for the Michalka sisters." Justin Moran of Out called the EP "triumphant." Sam Damshenas of Gay Times called the EP "synthpop perfection."

Track listing

Charts

Release history

References

2017 EPs
Aly & AJ albums
Self-released EPs
Synth-pop EPs